Przyłęk  is a village in the administrative district of Gmina Nowy Tomyśl, within Nowy Tomyśl County, Greater Poland Voivodeship, in west-central Poland.

The village has a population of 546.

World War II history
From 1940 to 1943, Przyłęk was the location of a Nazi German forced labour camp called Smolarnia for Jews and Poles enslaved in the construction of military highway from Berlin to Poznań passing through on the outskirts of the village (pl). Many of the 3,500 prisoners died there from disease, hunger and physical exhaustion. A monument to their memory was erected in 1979.

References

Villages in Nowy Tomyśl County